Knoxville is an unincorporated community in Marshall County, West Virginia, United States.

The community is named after William Knox, the proprietor of a local mill.

References 

Unincorporated communities in West Virginia
Unincorporated communities in Marshall County, West Virginia